"How You Like That" is a song recorded in Korean and Japanese by South Korean girl group Blackpink. It was released on June 26, 2020, through YG Entertainment, YG Plus and Interscope Records, as the pre-release single from the group's first Korean-language studio album, The Album (2020). An EDM, hip hop, trap, club and pop song, it was co-written by Danny Chung, R. Tee, 24, and Teddy Park, while the latter produced the song.

"How You Like That" was a commercial success in South Korea and peaked at number one on the Gaon Digital Chart for three weeks, marking Blackpink's third number-one single in the country. The song also topped the national charts in Hungary, Singapore, and Malaysia as well as Billboards K-pop Hot 100 and World Digital Songs charts, and figured within the record charts in 26 other countries. The song was certified platinum in South Korea and Japan for streaming as well as gold in Canada and silver in the United Kingdom, while the physical version was also certified platinum in South Korea for surpassing 250,000 units sold.

The accompanying music video for the song was directed by Seo Hyun-seung and uploaded onto Blackpink's YouTube channel simultaneously with the single's release. Upon release, the music video broke several YouTube records, including for the most-watched premiere, the most views within 24 hours for a music video—accumulating 86.3 million views in that time—and for the fastest to surpass 100 million and 200 million views. It also became one of the most-liked videos on YouTube with over 20 million likes. "How You Like That" won numerous accolades, including Song of Summer at the 2020 MTV Video Music Awards and Best Dance Award for a female group at both the 2020 Melon Music Awards and Mnet Asian Music Awards in Seoul.

Background and release
On May 4, 2020, it was reported that the group had finished recording their new album and were working on a schedule to shoot a music video later that month. On May 18, YG Entertainment shared an update on the project, projected for a June 2020 release, and revealed that more than ten songs were expected for their first full-length album. On June 10, YG Entertainment released the teaser poster to the single on social media and confirmed the comeback date to be June 26. Three days later, YG Entertainment released a prologue of the group's newest reality show, 24/365 with Blackpink, ahead of its launch on July 4, via YouTube. The show documents their comeback alongside sharing their lives through vlogs. According to member Jisoo in the prologue of 24/365 with Blackpink, the song represented a move from previous "powerful" music, describing it as more "swag".

On June 15, YG Entertainment released individual posters of the members. The teaser video was released on June 21. The official group teaser poster was revealed on June 22. The music video teaser was released on June 24, and the song officially premiered on June 26, 2020, after an hour-long live countdown. A physical version of the single was released on July 17, 2020, featuring the song and its instrumental.

Composition

"How You Like That" was written by Teddy Park, Danny Chung, R. Tee, 24 and produced by the later three. Musically, "How You Like That" is an EDM, hip hop, trap, club and pop song about "not being daunted by dark situations and to not lose the confidence and strength to stand up again".  A "thrillingly bombastic lead single", Billboard wrote, the track "fuses pop, trap and hip-hop with regal horn blasts and a braggadocious hook." In terms of musical notation, the song is written in the key of B major and has a tempo of 130 beats per minute.

Critical reception
Following the release of "How You Like That", it was met with generally positive reviews from music critics. Consequence of Sound named the song the 27th best track of the year, writing that the members "deliver a positive message of perseverance over a slamming, hip-hop-oriented track with plenty of explosive drops." The Los Angeles Times included the song in their list of 50 best songs of 2020, stating that the "squelchy, gum-smacking and titanically fun comeback should cement them as pop stars, full-stop, in the U.S. for years to come." Billboard magazine ranked the song at number 23 in their list of 100 Best Songs of 2020, complimenting its composition and the group's energy, further asserting the "fireworks show of a coda" was "the most thrilling 30 seconds of pop all year." Crystal Bell of Paper magazine opened the review by commenting it "was lambasted for its formulaic structure", however she rebutted that by highlighting its addictive nature and referred to the song as "gloriously big", having "significantly more cultural impact than their other singles this year."

Commercial performance 
In South Korea, the song debuted at number 12 on the Gaon Digital Chart issue dated June 21–27 with less than two days of tracking. The following week (June 28–July 4) it rose to number one, making it Blackpink's third single to do so, after "Whistle" (2016) and "Ddu-Du Ddu-Du" (2018). It remained atop the chart for three weeks and became the first song by the group since "Ddu-Du Ddu-Du" to top the Gaon Monthly chart. The physical version of the single debuted at number two on the Gaon Album Chart, and peaked at number one the following week. It sold 302,377 copies in 2020 and was certified Platinum by the Korea Music Content Association. The song entered the Billboard K-pop Hot 100 chart issue dated June 27 at number 50, and reached number one the following week on the issue dated July 4. In Japan, the single debuted at number 24 on the Oricon Combined Singles Chart with 8,219 downloads sold and 1,804,749 streams in its first three days. It debuted at number 17 on the Billboard Japan Hot 100 with 3,952 estimated units, and peaked at number eight the following week with 6,321 estimated units. The song peaked at number one in Malaysia and Singapore for eight weeks each, and was the highest-selling song of 2020 in Malaysia.

In the United States, "How You Like That" debuted at number 33 on the Billboard Hot 100, tying with "Sour Candy" as the highest-charting song by a female Korean act at that time. It debuted at number two on the Digital Song Sales chart with 16,400 copies sold and at number 18 on the Streaming Songs chart. The song also reached the top twenty in Australia, Canada, Estonia, Hungary, New Zealand, the United Kingdom and Scotland. The track reached 38.9 million streams in the UK as of September 2022, becoming the group's third most streamed song in the country. Globally, "How You Like That" debuted at number five and peaked at number two on the daily Spotify Global Chart, breaking the record for the biggest girl group debut in Spotify history. Following the chart's launch in September, "How You Like That" charted on the Billboard Global 200 for 34 weeks, becoming the third longest-charting song by a K-pop act as well as the longest-charting song among all female K-pop acts. In 2021, the song became the first by a female Korean group to surpass 500 million streams on Spotify.

Music video

Background and synopsis

The music video for "How You Like That" is directed by Seo Hyun-seung, who previously directed "Ddu-Du Ddu-Du" and "Kill This Love". It was the most streamed music video premiere on YouTube at the time with 1.66 million concurrent viewers, as well as one of the platform's most viewed music videos in its first 24 hours with 86.3 million views. It became the fastest video in the platform's history to hit 100 million views, doing so in 32 hours, and 200 million views, doing so in seven days. On November 12, 2021, the music video accumulated one billion views, becoming Blackpink's fifth music video and the fastest music video by a Korean female act to do so.

In the beginning scene of the music video, all four sit like queens atop steps. The members are depicted dancing in several locations, including a jungle, a trapezoidal hall, and the Arctic, all while rocking a parade of high-fashion looks. At the end, they are united in a dance break in a grand domed hall where the quartet are surrounded by back-up dancers. The colorful music video shows Jennie, Lisa, Rosé and Jisoo delivering both a message of resilience and a blistering kiss-off to an unseen foe.

Controversy sparked on social media after the official music video's release due to the inclusion of a statue of the Hindu god Ganesha in a solo scene with band member Lisa. The statue was used as a prop and placed on the floor next to a bejewelled Aladdin lamp, causing an outcry from fans who labelled the placement as "inappropriate" and "disrespectful", and the statue's usage as "cultural appropriation". The statue was subsequently edited out of the video.

Dance performance video
A dance performance video was additionally released on July 6, 2020; the video features the four members doing the full choreography in matching black athleisure in front of a hot pink background. In the climax, the girls are joined by eight back-up dancers for a high-energy, synchronized finale. In January 2021, it became the first K-pop dance performance video to reach 500 million views on YouTube. On February 7, 2022, it became the first K-pop dance performance video and Blackpink's sixth video to achieve one billion views. It also marked the first time that both the music video and the dance performance video for the same song reached one billion views each.

The dance performance video was named the 20th best music video of 2020 by Billboard and was praised as being "endlessly watchable".

Usage in media
The song was featured in the 10th episode of the first season of the Disney+ series Big Shot titled Marvyn's Playbook , which aired on June 18, 2021.

The song also was featured in the first trailer of Hotel Transylvania: Transformania in an interview with directors Derek Drymon and Jennifer Kluska.

Accolades

Track listing
Download and streaming
 1. "How You Like That" – 3:01
CD single
 1. "How You Like That" – 3:01
 2. "How You Like That" (Instrumental) – 3:01

Credits and personnel 
Credits adapted from liner notes from How You Like That (booklet) and Tidal. Recorded at YG Entertainment.

 Blackpink – vocals
 Teddy Park – lyricist, composer, producer
 Danny Chung – lyricist
 R. Tee – composer, arranger
 24 – composer, arranger

Charts

Weekly charts

Monthly charts

Year-end charts

Certifications

|-

Release history

See also

 List of certified albums in South Korea
 List of certified songs in South Korea
 List of Gaon Album Chart number ones of 2020
 List of Gaon Digital Chart number ones of 2020
 List of Inkigayo Chart winners (2020)
 List of K-pop Hot 100 number ones
 List of most-liked YouTube videos
 List of most-viewed online videos in the first 24 hours
 List of M Countdown Chart winners (2020)
 List of Music Bank Chart winners (2020)
 List of number-one songs of 2020 (Malaysia)
 List of number-one songs of 2020 (Singapore)
 List of Show! Music Core Chart winners (2020)

Notes

References

2020 singles
2020 songs
Blackpink songs
Interscope Records singles
YG Entertainment singles
Trap music songs
South Korean pop songs
South Korean hip hop songs
Electronic dance music songs
Songs written by Teddy Park
Gaon Digital Chart number-one singles
Billboard Korea K-Pop number-one singles
Number-one singles in Malaysia
Number-one singles in Singapore